Giulio Lopes, (Poá, SP) is a Brazilian actor.

Biography 
Born in Poá, São Paulo, Giulio Lopes made his first exhibition as an actor in the 1982 theater O Apocalipse ou o Capeta de Caruaru, by Aldomar Conrado, with "Caentrenós" group of amateur theater.

From then forth, the young man, that was a tradesman and started the administration course, decided to change the route of the career and study theater. In 1986, he received a scholarship in the Institute of Science and Art, and, in the next year, he was approved in the School of Theatrical Performance of the University of São Paulo.

Already in that epoch he participated in some publicist movies. However, it was only in the beginning of the 1990s that Giulio began to participate in telenovelas and miniseries of Rede Bandeirantes and Rede Globo.

Between 1990 and 1997, the actor dedicated himself to his company Capital Cenográfica, specialized in scenography.
Because the job withdrew him from the stages, Lopes decided to close the business and return to his career of an actor. He recaptured his career by participating in the 2001 theater Laços Eternos, of Zibia Gasparetto. He also acted as Berrão, character of the text of Plinio Marcos Homens de Papel, and integrated in the cast of O Enigma Blavatsky, of José Rubens Siqueira.

It was during the presentations of Homens de Papel that Giulio received an invitation to participate in the feature film Contra Todos, with the screenplay nd direction of Roberto Moreira. His actuation in the film gave him two prizes of best actor: in the 8th Cine PE and in the 14th FestNatal.

In 2005, he participated in other 3 films: Antônia (Tata Amaral), Querô (Carlos Cortez), and Os Doze Trabalhos (Ricardo Elias), with casting forecast to 2006.

In 2008, he participated in the film Meu Nome Não É Johnny (father of Estrella).

Works in Telenovelas 
 Desejo Proibido
 Tempo Final
 Malhação
 A Grande Família
 Cristal – Régis
 Sandy & Junior
 Da Cor do Pecado
 Um Anjo Caiu do Céu
 Vila Madalena
 Por Amor
 Torre de Babel
 Andando nas Nuvens
 Suave Veneno – Waldecir

In filmography 
 2008 – Verônica
 2008 – Meu Nome Não É Johnny 2008 – A Encarnação do Demônio 2007 – Casa em Ruínas 2007 – Duas Opções 2007 – Não Por Acaso 2007 – Querô – Delegado
 2007 – Os Doze Trabalhos – Officer
 2007 – Antônia – Antenor
 2003 – Contra Todos – Teodoro
 2002 – Viver no Carnaval In Theater 
 2007 – O Inimigo do Povo 2003 – O Enigma Blavatsky 2002 – Homens de Papel 2001 – Laços Eternos 1982 – O Apocalipse ou o Capeta de Caruaru''

External links 

 Official Website

References 

Brazilian male actors
1959 births
Living people